Oakleigh (a.k.a. Fant-Clapp House, Athenia, or West Home) is a historic mansion in Holly Springs, Mississippi, USA.

Location
The house is located at 506 Salem Avenue in Holly Springs, a small town in Marshall County, Northern Mississippi.

History
The two-storey mansion was built in 1858 for Judge Jeremiah W. Clapp. It was designed in the Greek Revival architectural style, with four Corinthian columns. The wrought-iron railings on the balconies were designed by the Jones, McElwain and Company Iron Foundry. Inside, the main hall is includes a large spiraling staircase. The dining-room, located behind the stairwell, is oval-shaped.

At the outset of the American Civil War of 1861–1865, the owner, Judge Clapp, was elected to the Congress of the Confederate States. As a result, he was in the crosshairs of the Union Army. When they ransacked the house, Clapp hid in the capital of one of the Corinthian columns. The house was then occupied by Union General Andrew Jackson Smith. It was liberated by Confederate General Earl Van Dorn in 1862.

In 1870, the mansion was acquired by Confederate General Absolom M. West, who served in the Mississippi State Senate.

Architectural significance
As a contributing property to the East Holly Springs Historic District, it has been listed on the National Register of Historic Places since April 20, 1983.

References

Greek Revival houses in Mississippi
Antebellum architecture
Buildings and structures in Holly Springs, Mississippi
Houses on the National Register of Historic Places in Mississippi
Houses completed in 1858
National Register of Historic Places in Marshall County, Mississippi
Historic district contributing properties in Mississippi